
A piñata cookie is a sugar cookie that is shaped and colored like a piñata and filled with various small candies which spill out when the cookie is broken. Piñata cookies may be multicolored, which involves preparing separate batches of cookie dough and dyeing them different colors. The dough is then layered into a loaf with the various colors being separated A cookie cutter may be used to create various shapes. After the cookies are baked, they are further prepared by creating a hollow pocket, inside which the fillings are placed. They may be filled with candies, such as miniature M&Ms candy, chocolate buttons, or other ingredients. They are then sealed using frosting. Piñata cookies are sometimes prepared for Cinco de Mayo.
Common ingredients in the dough's preparation include flour, vegetable oil, butter, sugar, powdered sugar, eggs, cream of tartar, vanilla, salt, food coloring and baking soda.

The piñata cookie was invented by Sandra Denneler in 2011, the recipe going viral online the next year. Similar desserts with a piñata-style filling include cakes, cupcakes and ice cream cones.

See also

 Cookie decorating
 List of cookies

References

Further reading

External links
 Cinco de Mayo piñata cookies. SheKnows.com

Cookies
Mexican culture